Harinelina Nathalia Rakotondramanana (born 15 January 1989, in Antananarivo) is a weightlifter. She represented Madagascar at the 2012 Summer Olympics held in London, United Kingdom. She is one of three sportspeople on the team to qualify for the Olympics rather than win a wild-card spot. She is also only the second Olympic weightlifter to represent her country. She ultimately finished last place in the 48 kilogram weight class.

References 

People from Antananarivo
1989 births
Malagasy female weightlifters
Olympic weightlifters of Madagascar
Weightlifters at the 2012 Summer Olympics
Living people
21st-century Malagasy people